The Aprilia RSV 1000 R is a sport bike motorcycle made by Italian company Aprilia from 2004 through 2010. Along with the bike's redesign Aprilia renamed the RSV from RSV Mille to RSV 1000 R.  It is offered in three versions: RSV 1000 R (while the "R" designation on the RSV Mille signified the higher spec version) is the standard version, the higher spec version is the RSV 1000 R Factory, and Aprilia made a limited edition version called RSV 1000 R Nera.

RSV 1000 R Factory
The RSV 1000 R Factory comes with fully adjustable Öhlins Racing rear monoshock and adjustable Öhlins steering damper, blue anodized forged aluminium wheels, frame finished in black or gold, and carbon fibre parts.

For 2006 the RSV 1000 R Factory won the Maxisport category for Masterbike 2006 and overall Masterbike of the year.

RSV 1000 R Nera
The RSV 1000 R Nera comes with carbon fibre body panels, magnesium wheels, full titanium exhaust, titanium nuts, bolts and fasteners (reducing the motorcycle's weight to 175 kg). It is powered by an enhanced version of the 60° v-twin magnesium engine producing  @ 10,000 rpm. Only 200 RSV 1000 R Nera motorcycles were made.

References

External links
Aprilia RSV 1000 R and  RSV 1000 R Factory official site
RSV 1000 R Review Road test of the Aprilia RSV 1000 R & Factory

RSV 1000 R
Sport bikes
Motorcycles introduced in 2004